Steven Terrell (born December 6, 1929) is an American actor who worked extensively on American films and television series in the 1950s and 1960s. He is best known for his association with American International Pictures for whom he made Invasion of the Saucer Men and Runaway Daughters.  He also played as Grove Nichols in the Perry Mason episode "The Case of the Blushing Pearls" and as Nick Lacy in the Ripcord episode "Willie".

Terrell and his wife Else Terrell later started a theatre troupe that came out of Minnesota and moved to San Diego in 1971 called "Lamb's Players Theatre" which still exists as of January 2022. This company has been in residence in Coronado, California as a regional theatre since 1994.  Steve and Else left the company in 1981.

Also appeared in the TV series The Restless Gun appearing as the title role in the episode "The Nowhere Kid". In 1957 he portrayed “Billy Baxter” on the TV series Gunsmoke in “Who Lives By The Sword” (S2E34).

References

External links

American male television actors
American male film actors
20th-century American male actors
1929 births
Living people